Ride with Norman Reedus is an American travel series that premiered on AMC on June 12, 2016. The series follows actor and motorcycle enthusiast Norman Reedus where he and a guest of the week travel across a different destination on a motorcycle while exploring the city's biker culture and checking out various locales.

AMC ordered the series on October 29, 2015 with a premiere date set for June 2016. The idea came from AMC president of original programming Joel Stillerman, who called Reedus about doing a show about his love for motorcycles to which Reedus replied "Yes, yes, yes right away" before Stillerman could change his mind. Reedus picks the ride companion for each episode due to their history and location, like Peter Fonda who is known for appearing in the film Easy Rider.

AMC renewed the series for a six-episode second season on September 23, 2016, which began on November 5, 2017. On September 12, 2017, AMC renewed the series for a third season, which premiered on February 10, 2019. On January 24, 2019, AMC renewed the series for a fourth season which premiered on March 8, 2020. On December 9, 2019, the series was renewed for a fifth season.

Guests

Season 1
Imogen Lehtonen – Jewelry Designer/Friend
Balthazar Getty – Actor
Jason Paul Michaels – Custom Bike Builder
Jake Lamagno – Artist/Friend
Brent Hinds – Musician
Peter Fonda – Actor

Season 2
Jeffrey Dean Morgan – Actor
Dave Chappelle – Actor/Comedian
Greg Nicotero – Director/Make-Up Effects Creator
Mario Batali – Chef
Mingus Reedus – Model/Norman's Son

Season 3
Jeffrey Dean Morgan – Actor 
Andrew Lincoln – Actor 
Ian Anderson – Singer
Elspeth Beard – Motorcyclist 
Steven Yeun – Actor 
Les Claypool – Singer/Bassist
Melissa McBride – Actress 
Austin Amelio – Actor
Sean Patrick Flannery – Actor
Marilyn Manson – Singer

Season 4
Michael Rooker – Actor
Ryan Hurst – Actor
Milo Ventimiglia – Actor
Dom Rocket – DJ/Friend 
Becky Goebel – Motorcyclist/Writer
Clifton Collins Jr. – Actor

Season 5
Josh Brolin – Actor
Dylan McDermott – Actor

Series overview

Episodes

Season 1 (2016)

Season 2 (2017)

Season 3 (2019)

Season 4 (2020)

Season 5 (2021)

In popular culture
An advertisement for the show appears in the 2019 video game Death Stranding, whose main character is portrayed by Reedus, along with a special "Ride" branded bike with Reedus' character referencing the show while riding it.

References

External links

2010s American reality television series
2016 American television series debuts
AMC (TV channel) original programming
English-language television shows
Motorcycle television series